Just Because I'm a Woman: Songs of Dolly Parton is a various-artists tribute album to Dolly Parton, released on October 14, 2003. The title song is a rerecording by Parton of a song she originally wrote during the 1960s and first included on her album Just Because I'm a Woman in 1968. The Emmylou Harris track "To Daddy" was recorded in 1978, and first appeared on Harris' album Quarter Moon in a Ten Cent Town (a single release of the song reached #3 on the U.S. country singles chart in early 1978); the remainder of the tracks on the album were new recordings by each of the artists made specifically for this project.

Track listing
"9 to 5" - Alison Krauss 
"I Will Always Love You" - Melissa Etheridge
"The Grass Is Blue" - Norah Jones
"Do I Ever Cross Your Mind" - Joan Osborne
"The Seeker" - Shelby Lynne
"Jolene" - Mindy Smith
"To Daddy" - Emmylou Harris
"Coat of Many Colors" - Shania Twain and Alison Krauss
"Little Sparrow" - Kasey Chambers
"Dagger Through the Heart" - Sinéad O'Connor
"Light of a Clear Blue Morning" - Allison Moorer
"Two Doors Down" - Me'shell Ndegeocello
"Just Because I'm a Woman" - Dolly Parton

Charts

Weekly charts

Year-end charts

References

External links
Just Because I'm A Woman: Songs of Dolly Parton at Dolly Parton On-Line

2003 albums
Country albums by American artists
Dolly Parton tribute albums
Sugar Hill Records albums